Charles D. Stickney (1857 – March 2, 1924) was an American lawyer and Republican politician from New York.

Early life
Stickney was born in Holland, New York and was descended from an old English family that settled in Massachusetts in 1637 and moved to New York State early in the 1800s.

He was educated at the Ten Broeck Academy in Franklinville before studying law with Judges Spring, Cortell and Hatch. He was admitted to the bar in 1882.

Career
He was Clerk of the Board of Supervisors of Erie County in 1888. Later he was an attorney for the New York State Tax Department; and a U.S. Commissioner for Deeds in and for the City of Buffalo.  After many years of service, he resigned his federal commissionership in the fall of 1923 to run for the State Assembly.

Stickney was elected and served as a member of the New York State Assembly, representing Erie County's third district, in the 147th New York State Legislature in 1924. After his death, the Assembly paid tribute to him by draping his desk in black and adjourning on motion of the Speaker Machold.

Personal life
In 1882, Stickney was married to Ida Mary West (1858–1928) of West Valley. Together, they were the parents of a daughter, Pearl Stickney, who married Edward J. Bartz.

Stickney died on March 2, 1924, after a major operation. After his funeral at the home of his daughter in Viola Park.  "A note he left said that he wished his ashes to be scattered where the sun shines and the flowers bloom." A memorial was placed at Forest Lawn Cemetery, Buffalo.

References

External links

1859 births
1924 deaths
Politicians from Buffalo, New York
Republican Party members of the New York State Assembly
Lawyers from Buffalo, New York
19th-century American lawyers